Iron Guard may refer to:

Iron Guard, common name of the interwar fascist movement and political party of Romania
Iron Guard death squads, death squads emerged from this organisation
Iron Guard (Argentina), peronist Argentinian political organisation
Iron Guard of Egypt, secret interwar pro-Axis society and royalist political movement of Egypt
Iron Guard of Palestine